Monique Mbeka Phoba (born 1962) is a filmmaker whose family comes from the Democratic Republic of the Congo (DRC) but who now lives in Benin.
Her films have won a number of awards.

Birth and education

Monique Mbeka Phoba was born in 1962 in Brussels, the daughter of a DRC diplomat.
She visited the DRC during her school holidays, but established herself in Belgium when aged sixteen after her father resigned his office.
She studied at the Saint-Louis High Business School, and obtained a degree in International Business in Brussels.
Her graduating thesis was on "Cooperation between the European and African audiovisual industries".
While she was a student, Monique Phoba gave talks on African culture on a radio for Student called Radio-Campus and wrote articles in various newspapers in Brussels and Geneva : Tam-Tam, Negrissimo and Regards Noirs. She then attended in documentary workshop at the Ateliers Varan in Paris.

Career

In 1991 Monique Mbeka Phoba made the film Revue en vrac (26 minutes) with Fred Mongu, a journalist of Zaire national television (OZRT).
This looked at the birth of the independent and pluralistic press in the DRC.
She then made a series of documentaries about Africa including Rentrer? (1993, 52 minutes), Deux petits tours et puis s'en vont (1997) about the presidential elections in Benin, Un rêve d'indépendance (1998, 53 minutes) about her own grandfather under Belgian colonization and Sorcière, la vie (A Bewitched Life) (2004, 52 minutes).

Rentrer? discusses the problem of brain drain.  It received the South / North prize of the European Council at Rencontres Media Nord/Sud in Geneva en 1996. 
Her short film Une voix dans le Silence on 1996 tells of the struggle of Bruno Ediko, an HIV-positive Beninese.
Her fourth documentary Deux petits tours et puis s'en vont… (Two little turns and then go ..) was co-directed with Emmanuel Kolawole.
Benin, the laboratory of African democracy, is the theme of this film which won second prize for TV/Video documentary at FESPACO in March 1997.
In her 1998 film Un rêve d'indépendance she portrays 35 years of independence in the Democratic Republic of the Congo. This documentary received the "Images of Women" award at the Vues d'Afrique Festival in Montreal in April 2000.

In 2001 Monique Mbeka Phoba's documentary Anna, l'Enchantée was released.  It tells of Anna Teko, a singer who won a scholarship to study music in France.
Poorly prepared, Anna does not last more than three months.  The documentary won the "Images of Women" prize at the Vues d'Afrique Festival in Montreal in April 2002.
Her 2006 Sorcière, la vie! shows the life of an old man who was a medical assistant under Belgian colonization, a doctor after independence, and who then agreed to become a customary judge after his retirement.  The film explores the prevalence of belief in witchcraft in the community through cases brought before the old man. 
In 2007 she completed a documentary on the Zaire national team, the Leopards, which shone in the 1974 football World Cup.
This team was the first from sub-Saharan Africa team to participate in a FIFA World Cup.
Entre la coupe et l'élection (Between the cup and the election) was co-directed with Guy Kabeya Muya.

From 1995 to 2007, Monique Mbeka Phoba lived in Benin, where she has worked on production, distribution and promotion of African cinema.
She created the Lagunimages TV and documentary festival in 2000.
Since 2007, Monique Mbeka Phoba lived in Belgium where she obtained a new degree in scriptwriting. She then produced herself her first feather short movie: Sister Oyo.

Filmography

References

External links
 Interview conducted during Vues d'Afrique, April 1997 Montreal, Quebec

1962 births
Living people
Democratic Republic of the Congo film directors
Democratic Republic of the Congo expatriates in Benin
Belgian film directors
Belgian women film directors
Mass media people from Brussels
Université libre de Bruxelles alumni
Belgian people of Democratic Republic of the Congo descent